This is a List of North American Championships medalists in sailing.

49er

49er FX

470

Laser

Laser Radial

RS:X

Men

Women

Soling

Star

References

Sailing-related lists